Alberto Rivera (born 19 September 1954) is a Mexican equestrian. He competed in two events at the 1988 Summer Olympics.

References

1954 births
Living people
Mexican male equestrians
Olympic equestrians of Mexico
Equestrians at the 1988 Summer Olympics
Pan American Games medalists in equestrian
Pan American Games bronze medalists for Mexico
Equestrians at the 1983 Pan American Games
Equestrians at the 1987 Pan American Games
Place of birth missing (living people)
Medalists at the 1983 Pan American Games
Medalists at the 1987 Pan American Games